Siah Choqai-ye Olya (also Romanized as Sīāh Choqāī-ye ‘Olyā; also known as Sīāh Choqā-ye ‘Olyā) is a village in Mahidasht Rural District, Mahidasht District, Kermanshah County, Kermanshah Province, Iran. At the 2006 census, its population was 33, in 9 families.

References 

Populated places in Kermanshah County